Robert Hawley Ingersoll (December 26, 1859 - September 4, 1928) was an American businessman who initiated the "Dollar Watch," the first mass-produced inexpensive pocket watch in 1896.

Biography
Robert H. Ingersoll was born on December 26, 1859, in Delta, Michigan, to Orville Boudinot Ingersoll and Mary Elizabeth Beers.

Robert moved to New York City in 1879 and entered the employment of his brother Howard, making and selling rubber stamps. In 1880 Robert opened his own wholesale business, also selling rubber stamps. In 1881 he was joined by his brother Charles Henry Ingersoll (1865–1948).

The first  Ingersoll watches, called "Universal" were introduced in 1892, supplied by the Waterbury Clock Company. In 1896 Ingersoll introduced a watch called the Yankee, setting its price at $1. This made it the cheapest watch available at the time, and the first watch to be priced at one dollar; the "dollar watch" was born.

William H. Ingersoll was later a partner in the business.

On June 22, 1904, in Muskegon, Michigan, he married Roberta Maria Bannister.

Ingersoll later bought the bankrupt New England Watch Company in 1914 and renamed it the Ingersoll Watch Company.

The company went bankrupt in 1921 following its over-expansion during World War I.  Its assets were sold to the Waterbury Clock Company, the predecessor of the modern day Timex Group USA.

His wife was involved in an attempted murder-suicide in 1926 when she shot her lover and then took her own life with a gunshot to her breast.

Robert H. Ingersoll died on September 4, 1928, in Denver, Colorado.

References

Further reading
James W. Neilson, The American Pocket Watch, June 1964

American manufacturing businesspeople
1859 births
1928 deaths